M.L. Liebler (born Michael Lynn Liebler in 1953 in Detroit, Michigan) is the author and editor of several books of poetry including Brooding in the Heartlands. He is a senior lecturer at Wayne State University, Detroit, Michigan.

Selected writings
Working Words:Punching the Clock & Kicking Out the Jams, Coffee House Press (2010)
Wide Awake in Someone Else's Dream, Wayne State University Press (2008) 
Stripping the Adult Century Bare, Burning Cities Press (1995) 
Deliver Me, Ridgeway Press (1991)  
Breaking the Voodoo, Parkville Press (1990)

References

External links 
 

1953 births
Living people
Writers from Detroit
Wayne State University faculty